Vânători may refer to several places:

Romania

 Vânători, Galați, a commune in Galați County
 Vânători, Iași, a commune in Iaşi County
 Vânători, Mehedinți, a commune in Mehedinţi County
 Vânători, Mureș, a commune in Mureș County
 Vânători, Vrancea, a commune in Vrancea County
 Vânători-Neamţ, a commune in Neamţ County
 Vânători, a village in Mișca Commune, Arad County
 Vânători, a village in Gorbănești Commune, Botoşani County
 Vânători, a village in Ciucea Commune, Cluj County
 Vânători, a village in Pecineaga Commune, Constanţa County
 Vânători, a village in Popricani Commune, Iaşi County
 Vânători, a village in Petrăchioaia Commune, Ilfov County
 Vânători, a village in Lisa, Teleorman Commune, Teleorman County

Vânători may also refer to:
Vânători (military unit), an elite light infantry unit of the Romanian Army

Moldova
 Vînători, Nisporeni, a commune in Nisporeni district